The governor of Mauritius was the official who governed the Crown Colony of Mauritius (now Republic of Mauritius) during the British colonial period between 1810 and 1968. Upon the end of British rule and the independence of Mauritius in 1968, this office was replaced by the governor-general, who represented the British monarch and not the Government of the United Kingdom as did the governor. The office of Governor-General was itself abolished in 1992 and replaced by the post of President when Mauritius became a republic.

List of governors (1810–1968)
A list of British governors of Mauritius from 1810 to 1968.

Flag of the governor

See also

 Governor of Mauritius

References

Mauritius
Lists of political office-holders in Mauritius
 
Governor